Option or Options may refer to:

Computing 
Option key, a key on Apple computer keyboards
Option type, a polymorphic data type in programming languages
Command-line option, an optional parameter to a command
OPTIONS, an HTTP request method

Literature 
Options (novel), a novel by Robert Sheckley
Option (car magazine), a Japanese car magazine
Option (music magazine), a defunct American music magazine

Legal rights 
Option (aircraft purchasing)
South Tyrol Option Agreement, a forced resettling contract between fascist Italy and Nazi Germany regarding the German-speaking inhabitants of South Tyrol
Option (filmmaking), a contractual agreement between a film producer and a writer, in which the producer obtains the right to buy a screenplay from the writer before a certain date.
Option (finance), an instrument that conveys the right, but not the obligation, to engage in a future transaction (for example, on some underlying security or on a parcel of real property), or in a futures contract
Option contract, a type of legal contract

Music
 "Options" (Luke James song), 2014
 "Options" (NSG song), 2018
 "Options", a song by Doja Cat from Planet Her, 2021
 "Options", a song by EarthGang, 2020
 "Options", a song by Iñigo Pascual, 2019
 "Options", a song by Loren Gray, 2019
 "Options", a song by Internet Money, 2022
 "Options", a song by NF from The Search, 2019
 "Options", a song by PartyNextDoor from PartyNextDoor Two, 2014
 "Options", a song by Pedro the Lion from Control, 2002
 "Options", a song by Pitbull from Climate Change, 2017

Sport 
Option (baseball), a baseball player who can be moved back and forth between major and minor league teams
Option offense, an offensive scheme in American football primarily predicated on option runs
Option run, a play in American and Canadian football

Other uses 
"Options" (Welcome to Paradox), an episode of Welcome to Paradox
Option N.V., a company providing wireless technology devices
 "The Option", an alternate name for the South Tyrol Option Agreement, a resettlement program of German speakers living in Italy initiated by Adolf Hitler and Benito Mussolini
 Flight Options, an American fractional ownership airline founded by Kenn Ricci that uses the callsign "Options"